Jinyinhu Park Station, is a station on Line 6 of the Wuhan Metro. It entered revenue service on December 28, 2016. It is located in Dongxihu District and it was the northern terminus of Line 6 until December 26, 2021.

Station layout

References

Wuhan Metro stations
Line 6, Wuhan Metro
Railway stations in China opened in 2016